Jerome Kiely (born 23 May 1925) is an Irish poet.

Born in Kinsale, County Cork on 23 May 1925, Kiely was educated at the county's diocesean college and at St. Patrick's, Maynooth. He was ordained a priest in 1950 and he won the Adam Prize for poetry in 1956.

He was still working as the Parish Priest of Aughadown (near Skibbereen) until 1995 when he was removed by Bishop Michael Murphy after allegations of sexual abuse of an altar boy came to light.[2] No complaints were made to the Gardai.

Kiely Published Swallows in December in 2006 and The Moon Canoe in 2010.

References

Sources
 Irish Poetry of Faith and Doubt:The Cold Heaven, p. 187,  ed. John F. Deane, Wolfhound Press, 1990.

External links
 http://www.thefreelibrary.com/Bishop+sets+up+abuse+helpline.-a060667588

1925 births
Living people
Alumni of St Patrick's College, Maynooth
Irish poets
People from County Cork